Ivanić-Grad or Ivanić Grad is a town in Zagreb County, Croatia. It is part of Moslavina.

Geography
Ivanić-Grad is located south-east from Zagreb, connected:
  by highway A3 (Bregana-Zagreb-Ivanić-Grad-Slavonski Brod-Lipovac)
  by train  on direction Zagreb - Slavonski Brod - Vinkovci.

Population
In the 2011 census, the total population is 14,548, in the following settlements:

 Caginec, population 555
 Deanovec, population 536
 Derežani, population 246
 Graberje Ivanićko, population 664
 Greda Breška, population 156
 Ivanić-Grad, population 9,379
 Lepšić, population 46
 Lijevi Dubrovčak, population 351
 Opatinec, population 321
 Posavski Bregi, population 816
 Prečno, population 98
 Prerovec, population 98
 Šemovec Breški, population 85
 Šumećani, population 494
 Tarno, population 57
 Topolje, population 112
 Trebovec, population 347
 Zaklepica, population 88
 Zelina Breška, population 99

In the 2011 census, 97% of the population were Croats.

Administration
City government, court, police, health-service, post office are the part of infrastructure of Ivanić-Grad. Ivanić-Grad also has a well-known spa resort, Naftalan.

History
Ivanić-Grad was a border post between the Habsburg monarchy and the Ottoman Empire. In Habsburg Latin sources, it was known as Iwanych.

Until 1918, Ivanić-Grad was part of the Austrian monarchy (Kingdom of Croatia-Slavonia after the compromise of 1867), in the Croatian Military Frontier.

Notable people
 Juraj Krnjević was one of the principal leaders of the Croatian Peasant Party (HSS) wholly devoted to achieving Croatian democracy and freedom.
 Đuro Deželić, writer

Education
There are 2 elementary schools (OŠ Stjepana Basaričeka and OŠ Đure Deželića) and a high school (SŠ Ivan Švear) in Ivanić-Grad.

OŠ Đure Deželića has the status of an international eco-school and has a green flag.

References

Cities and towns in Croatia
Populated places in Zagreb County
Spa towns in Croatia